Alberto Melillo (April 1, 1866 in Naples – 1915) was an Italian painter.

He completed his studies under Domenico Morelli and Vincenzo Marinelli in Naples. Among his works is Guapperello, a half-figure displayed at the Promotrice of Genoa. To the 1888 Italian Exhibition at London, he sent Il racconto della nonna, Il pasto ai polli, Un paesaggio, and two pastel head portraits. He also exhibited some artistic maiolica, for which he earned a diploma of honor. At the Promotrice of Naples, he displayed a pastel of a peasant woman, life size.

References

19th-century Italian painters
Italian male painters
1866 births
1915 deaths
Painters from Naples
Italian genre painters
20th-century Italian painters
19th-century Italian male artists
20th-century Italian male artists